Tripp Lite is an American manufacturer of power protection and connecting electrical devices.  It was founded in 1922 and is headquartered in Chicago, Illinois. The company employs more than 450 people and maintains a sales presence in over 80 countries worldwide. Tripp Lite manufactures a variety of product categories, including UPS systems, UPS replacement batteries, surge protectors, electrical cables and connectors, power inverters, KVM switches, power strips, PDUs, racks and rack cooling systems, power management software, laptop accessories, and audio/video solutions. Tripp Lite is ISO 9001 certified.

History 
Tripp Lite grew along with the cloud computing industry with their products widely used in data centers.

In 2020 Tripp Lite filed a lawsuit against the federal government over the Trump tariffs on Chinese goods.

By April 2020 Tripp Lite executive Barre Seid had acquired a 100% stake in the company. Seid donated the company to the newly created political advocacy group Marble Freedom Trust. The Marble Freedom Trust is headed by Leonard Leo, a longtime leader of the Federalist Society and the primary architect of the movement to reshape the judiciary with conservative judges who went on to overturn Roe v. Wade.  In March 2021 Marble Freedom Trust sold Tripp Lite to the Eaton Corporation for $1.65 billion, a transaction that may have been designed to fund conservative political causes while avoiding taxes.

Awards
2013 Business Solutions Best Channel Vendor
2013 CEPro BEST Award

References

Technology companies of the United States
Companies based in Chicago
2020 mergers and acquisitions
2021 mergers and acquisitions